Software 2000 was a video game developer and publisher based in Germany.

The company was formed in 1987 in Eutin, Schleswig-Holstein, by brothers Andreas and Marc Wardenga. They produced and published games for various formats, originally the Atari ST and Amiga platforms, and later for the Personal computer (PC), Game Boy Color and a few titles for the PlayStation.

Perhaps their most successful venture was the Bundesliga Manager series, based on the German soccer Premier League. They also produced a series of "Artventure" interactive fiction games, in the German language. In the mid-1990s, they produced other spinoff manager games, including Eishockey Manager (Ice Hockey Manager) and the Pizza Syndicate series for the PC. They also developed the puzzle game Swing, released for the PlayStation in 1998.

The company produced several titles with small development teams. This proved fatal with the rising standards of full priced games. With falling sales and important figures leaving the company, Software 2000 filed for bankruptcy in 2002.

Games

References 

Video game companies established in 1987
Defunct video game companies of Germany